The City of Santa Rosa Multi-Purpose Complex, also known as Santa Rosa Sports Complex and as Santa Rosa Sports Coliseum, is an indoor arena in Santa Rosa, Laguna, Philippines with a capacity of 5,700 spectators.

The construction of the sports arena began in 2015 and was officially inaugurated on March 5, 2017.

The arena is one of the playing venues of the Philippine Basketball Association (PBA), ASEAN Basketball League and the Philippine Super Liga. It is the venue for the sport of netball at the 2019 Southeast Asian Games.

References

Volleyball venues in the Philippines
Basketball venues in the Philippines
Buildings and structures in Santa Rosa, Laguna
Sports in Laguna (province)
Sports venues completed in 2017
Indoor arenas in the Philippines
2017 establishments in the Philippines